Forest Green Rovers Football Club are a professional football club based in Nailsworth, Gloucestershire, England.

Formed in October 1889, the club became founder members of the Mid Gloucestershire League five years later. Competing in various local league competitions for much of the 20th century, they won a multitude of league titles: the Dursley & District League (1902–03), the Stroud and District Football League (1911–12 and 1920–21), the Stroud Premier League (1934–35, 1935–36 and 1936–37), the North Gloucestershire League (1920–21 and 1921–22), and the Gloucestershire Northern Senior League (1937–38, 1949–50 and 1950–51). They became founder members of the Gloucestershire County League in 1968, before they were moved up to the Premier Division of the Hellenic League seven years later.

Forest Green won the Hellenic League in the 1981–82 season and lifted the FA Vase after beating Rainworth Miners Welfare in the final at Wembley. They spent the next 13 years in the Midland Division of the Southern League, and briefly competed under the name Stroud F.C. Reverting to the name Forest Green Rovers, the club won successive Southern League Southern Division and Premier Division titles in 1996–97 and 1997–98, winning promotion into the Conference. Reaching the 1999 FA Trophy Final, which they lost, they became the first club to reach the finals of both the FA Vase and FA Trophy.   They also reached the 2001 FA Trophy Final, which again they lost. Twice reprieved from relegation from the Conference National due to the demotion of other clubs, the club was transformed following investment from green energy industrialist Dale Vince in 2010.

Under Vince's chairmanship Forest Green became the world's first vegan football club in 2015, and the New Lawn was installed with numerous eco-friendly innovations. Investment in the playing squad saw the club compete for promotion into the English Football League, which they achieved with victory in the 2017 National League play-offs, having been beaten in the semi-finals in 2015 and in the 2016 final. Forest Green were then promoted to League One in 2022 for the first time in their history, following an EFL League Two title win.

History

Local and county leagues
The club was established in 1889 by Rev. E.J.H. Peach, representing the Forest Green area of Nailsworth. The name Rovers was adopted in 1893, and the following year the club were founder members of the Mid-Gloucestershire League. Their first home league match on 6 October was a 1–1 draw with Brimscombe, and the club went on to finish the 1894–95 season in third place. Nailsworth had become an urban district in 1894 and there was an effort to ensure the town was represented by a football team. As a result, the club was renamed Nailsworth Association Football Club and many members of the original team were replaced by players from Nailsworth, although they continued to play at the original Lawn Ground in Forest Green. However, the club withdrew from the league during the 1896–97 season.

The club was re-established in 1898 under the Forest Green Rovers name, and absorbed Nailsworth Thursday shortly afterwards. They joined both Division One of the Mid-Gloucestershire League and also the Dursley & District League for the 1899–1900 season. The Mid-Gloucestershire League folded in 1901, with Forest Green left playing in the Dursley & District League. In 1902–03 they joined the new Stroud & District League, also continuing in the Dursley & District League. In the Stroud & District League they finished as runners-up to Brimscombe, whilst in the Dursley & District League they finished joint top of the table with Stonehouse after being awarded the points from an unplayed match against Chalford. As a result, a play-off match was held to decide the championship, with over 1,000 spectators watching Forest Green win 2–1 in extra time. In 1906–07 they finished bottom of the Stroud & District League with zero points (although they had won one game, they had two points deducted for fielding an ineligible player). They withdrew from the Dursley & District League in 1908.

In 1911 Forest Green merged with Nailsworth to form Nailsworth & Forest Green United, continuing to play at the Lawn Ground and in the Stroud & District League; the new club won the league, losing only one match all season. They entered a team into the Dursley & District League in 1912–13, but withdrew from the Stroud & District League after only four matches. After World War I the club rejoined the league and the 1919–20 season saw them finish joint top of the table with Chalford and Stonehouse. The league subsequently held a draw to decide the championship, with Forest Green drawn against Stonehouse in a semi-final, with the winner to play Chalford for the title. However, Stonehouse beat Forest Green 3–2 in the semi-final match. In 1920 the club also entered a team into the North Gloucestershire League and went on to win both leagues, as well as the Northern Junior Cup. They repeated the double league championship the following season. They were founder members of the Gloucestershire Northern Senior League in 1922, but left the league at the end of the 1922–23 season to return to the Stroud & District League.

Forest Green finished as runners-up in 1924–25 and 1925–26, before rejoining the Gloucestershire Northern Senior League in 1926. They went on to finish as runners-up in 1926–27 before leaving the league again to play in the new Stroud Premier League. After finishing fourth in the league, the club returned to the Northern Senior League at the end of the season, although they also kept a team in the Stroud Premier League. The club withdrew from the Stroud Premier League in 1930, the league for a third time in 1934, rejoining the Stroud Premier League. They were Stroud Premier League champions for three successive seasons in 1934–35, 1935–36 and 1936–37, before re-entering the Northern Senior League in 1937. They went on to win the league title in 1937–38. After finishing as runners-up in 1948–49, they won successive league titles in 1949–50 and 1950–51. Although the club finished as runners-up in 1952–53, they were relegated to Division Two at the end of the 1954–55 season. However, they were Division Two champions the following season, and were promoted back to Division One. Forest Green were amongst the founders of the Gloucestershire County League in 1968, where they played until moving up to the Premier Division of the Hellenic League in 1975 under the management of Peter Goring.

Regional leagues
Forest Green's first season in the Hellenic League Premier Division saw them finish fourth. Although they then spent two seasons in lower mid-table, a third-place finish in 1978–79 was the start of a successful four years, culminating in the 1981–82 season, in which they won the Hellenic League and reached the final of the FA Vase. At Wembley they defeated Rainworth Miners Welfare 3–0 to win the trophy. At the end of the season the club were promoted to the Midland Division of the Southern League. Although they finished third in their first season in the new league, the next six seasons were spent in mid-table.

In 1989, the club was renamed Stroud Football Club. Another season in mid-table was followed by two in which they finished in the bottom five. They also participated in the Welsh Cup for four seasons, reaching the quarter finals in 1990-91 where they were defeated by the eventual runners-up Wrexham. After reverting to their original name, the club continued to struggle in the league until they were transferred to the Southern Division in 1995. After finishing eighth under Frank Gregan in 1995–96, they won the division the following season, earning promotion to the Premier Division of the Southern League. The 1997–98 season saw them win the Southern League Premier Division, securing a second successive promotion and entry to the Football Conference.

Conference, Football League and promotion to League One
In Forest Green's first season in the Conference they finished twelfth, as well as reaching the final of the FA Trophy, becoming the first team to play in the final of both the FA Vase and the FA Trophy. However, they lost 1–0 to Kingstonian. The following season saw another first as the club reached the first round of the FA Cup for the first time; after beating Guiseley 6–0 in the first round, they lost 3–0 at home to Torquay United in the second. In November 2000 Gregan was replaced as manager by former England international Nigel Spink; the club reached the FA Trophy final again at the end of the season, losing 1–0 to Canvey Island.

In 2004–05 Forest Green finished in the relegation zone, but were reprieved after Northwich Victoria were demoted due to issues with their stadium. In 2007–08 the club defeated Football League opposition in the FA Cup for the first time, beating Rotherham United 3–0 in a first round replay, before losing 3–2 at Swindon Town. The following season saw them reach the third round of the Cup for the first time, beating Team Bath and then Rochdale to set a third round tie at home to Derby County which they lost 4–3 in front of a record crowd of 4,836. Another third round appearance in 2009–10 ended with a 2–1 defeat at Notts County.

The 2009–10 season saw Forest Green finish in the relegation zone, but another reprieve from relegation was won when Salisbury City were expelled for breaking financial rules. The club was then taken over by Ecotricity founder Dale Vince; Vince set out plans to make the club more eco-friendly, including removing red meat from players' diets, stopping selling meat products in the ground and treating the pitch with organic fertiliser.

Forest Green finished fifth in the Conference in 2014–15, qualifying for the promotion play-offs; they went on to lose 3–0 on aggregate to Bristol Rovers in the semi-finals. The following season saw them finish as runners-up in the renamed National League, their highest-ever league position; in the subsequent play-offs they defeated Dover Athletic 2–1 in the semi-finals, before losing 3–1 to Grimsby Town in the final at Wembley. A third consecutive play-off campaign was secured with a third-place finish in 2016–17. After beating Dagenham & Redbridge 3–1 in the semi-finals, the club defeated Tranmere Rovers by the same scoreline in the final at Wembley, earning promotion to League Two. This made Nailsworth the smallest town ever to host a Football League club.

In 2018 Forest Green Rovers became the first football club in the world to be certified carbon neutral under the United Nations Framework Convention on Climate Change (UNFCCC) initiative Climate Neutral Now. The 2018–19 season saw them finish fifth in League Two. They went on to lose 2–1 to Tranmere Rovers in the play-off semi-finals. Another play-off campaign in 2020–21 saw them lose 5–4 on aggregate to Newport County.

In 2021–22 they secured an automatic promotion spot to League One after a draw against Bristol Rovers, and clinched the title following a 2–2 draw away at Mansfield Town. They won their first League One game, defeating Bristol Rovers 2–1 away thanks to a late goal.

Green credentials
The United Nations has recognised Forest Green Rovers as the world’s first carbon-neutral football club and it was described by FIFA as the “greenest team in the world”.

In September 2020, Arsenal fullback Héctor Bellerín became the second-largest shareholder in the club.

On 2 August 2021, Forest Green Rovers announced a new partnership with clean energy and electric vehicle YouTube channel, Fully Charged and named their pitch accordingly to The Fully Charged New Lawn.

Colours and crest
The previous club badge was very similar to the FC Barcelona badge. The flag of St. George appeared on both badges, showing his links to England as well as Catalonia. Rovers' home kit for many years was a black and white striped shirt with black shorts.

In May 2011, the club released a consultation for supporters inviting opinions on the club's decision to change its badge. The new badge was used from the beginning of the 2011–2012 season.

On 2 July 2012, it was announced that the club would change its home strip from its traditional black and white stripes to a lime green shirt with black shorts and socks. The decision to move away from the traditional black and white stripes proved controversial with many supporters. The away strip was also changed to an all-white kit with the dates '1899–2012' near the neckline of the kit to indicate the years when the club first played in an all-white kit and the decision to bring it back in 2012.

In the summer of 2014 the home strip was changed to lime green and black stripes on the front, with a plain green back, green shorts and black and green striped socks in order to align with sponsor Ecotricity's marketing colours. On 19 August 2014, the new away strip was announced, which would be a modern version of the traditional home strip of black and white striped shirt, black shorts and red socks.

In 2021, the team became the first in the world to play in a football kit made from a composite material consisting of recycled plastic and coffee grounds.

Rivalries
Gloucestershire rivals Cheltenham Town are seen as the club's main rivals. Fixtures between the two sides are humorously named El Glosico, a play-on-words of the famous El Clásico fixture.

During the club's years in the non-league pyramid, the club maintained local rivalries with Gloucester City, and Bath City. However, following Rovers' promotion to the EFL in 2017, these rivalries are no longer competed.

Smaller rivalries have since developed with Bristol Rovers and Newport County.

Stadium

The club initially played at a ground 'at the top of the hill' in Forest Green known as the Lawn Ground. They moved to a ground in Nailsworth in 1924, but returned to the Lawn in 1927 after it was upgraded with a boundary wall and entrance gates. At the start of the 2006–07 season the club moved to the New Lawn.

The Sustainability in Sport terrace is at the north end of the ground. This terrace was the location for away fans and had previously housed home supporters which it has reverted to. A decision by the club at the end of the 2012–13 season saw the areas in which home and away fans were housed at the ground switched with home fans reverting to the EESI Stand at the opposite end of the ground which was converted from seating to a standing terrace. Subsequently away fans have been accommodated in the West side of the ground. The East Stand is the largest-capacity stand at the ground and is a seated stand that contains seven boxes, the 'Green Man' public house, gym, dance studio and conference and leisure facilities. The western side of the ground is an open terrace now the area for away fans with a small covered seating area. Although the stadium can hold 5,147 fans, the highest league attendance recorded at the venue so far was 3,781 in a Conference Premier fixture against Bristol Rovers. However, the highest all-time attendance was 4,836 for an FA Cup third round tie at home to Championship side Derby County. The usual attendance was between 1,300 and 1,800 for National League fixtures.

In June 2011, the club began work on making the stadium environmentally friendly following the arrival of new owner and green energy entrepreneur Dale Vince. This included developing an entirely organic pitch. In December 2011, 180 solar panels were installed on the roof of the EESI stand, helping the club generate 10% of the electricity needed to run the stadium. In April 2012, Forest Green introduced the first robot lawn mower to be used by a British football club on to its playing surface. This followed a previous robot mower that had been in service at the club's former ground. The Etesia robot mower – known as a 'mow bot' – uses GPS technology to guide it round the pitch without the need for human intervention and gathers power from the solar panels at the stadium. In December 2012, the club beat 200 other nominees to first prize in the Institute of Groundsmanship awards in the sustainability and environmental category for its organic pitch and the environmental aspects at The New Lawn.

On 3 November 2016, the club announced the winning design for a proposed 5,000 seat new stadium to be built within the Eco Park complex beside Junction 13 of the M5 in Gloucestershire, 1.5 miles west of the town of Stonehouse (and 8.5 miles northwest of their spiritual home of Nailsworth). The design is for a stadium made almost entirely of wood, including the roof cantilevers. It will be able to be increased in size to 10,000 capacity depending on the club's success. The plans were initially rejected by the planning authorities in June 2019 but revised plans were approved later that year. The English Football League gave their consent to the stadium in February 2021. It is intended that the new stadium will have the lowest carbon footprint of any stadium in the world. Vince hoped that the club would be able to play games at the stadium within "three or four years".

Current squad

Out on loan

Coaching staff

Managerial history

Honours

National Honours (6) 
League Two (Champions): 2021/22
National League (Play-off winners): 2016/17
Conference League Cup (Runners-up): 2008/09
FA Trophy (Runners-up): 1998/99, 2000/01
FA Vase (Champions): 1981/82

Regional Champions (3) 

Southern League Premier: 1997/98
Southern League Southern: 1996/97
Hellenic League: 1981/82

County Champions (20)
 Gloucestershire Senior Cup: 1984/85, 1985/86, 1986/87, 2015/2016
Gloucestershire Northern Senior League: 1937/38, 1949/50, 1950/51, 1976/77 
Division Two: 1955–56, 1969/70, 1975/76
Gloucestershire Northern Amateur Cup: 1920/21, 1926/27, 1945/46, 1971/72, 1975/76, 1977/78
Junior Cup: 1958/59, 1965/66, 1969/70

Local League Champions (23) 
Stroud & District League: 1911/12, 1920/21, 1921/22, 1934/35, 1935/36, 1936/37, 1945/46, 1953/54, 1958/59
Division 2: 1938/39
Division 3: 1920/21, 1921/22, 1925/26
North Gloucestershire League: 1920/21, 1921/22
Division 2: 1921/22
Dursley & District League: 1902/03, 1931/32, 1934/35, 1935/36, 1936/37
Severn League: 1931/32, 1938/39

Local Cup Champions (23) 

 Stroud Charity Cup: 1922/23, 1926/27, 1929/30, 1932/33, 1935/36, 1936/37, 1937/38, 1945/46, 1952/53, 1957/58, 1958/59, 1969/70, 1970/71, 1971/72, 1972/73, 1973/74
 Junior Cup: 1957/58, 1958/59, 1973/74
 Berkeley Hospital Cup: 1969/70, 1970/71, 1974/75
 David Russell Memorial Trophy: 1987/88

Women's Team (7) 

 Division One South West (4th Tier Champions): 2014/15
 South West Regional WFL: Eastern Division (6th Tier Champions): 2016/17, 2020/21
 GFA Women’s Trophy (County Cup Winners): 2008/09, 2013/14, 2014/15, 2015/16

Records
Best league position: 1st in League Two, 2021–22
Best FA Cup performance: Third round, 2008–09, 2009–10, 2022–23
Best EFL Cup performance: Second round, 2018–19, 2019–20, 2021–22, 2022–23
Best Welsh Cup performance: Quarter finals, 1990-91
Record attendance: 4,836 vs Derby County, FA Cup third round, 3 January 2009
Biggest victory: 18-1 vs Dursley, Stroud League, March 1946
Heaviest defeat: 10–0 vs Gloucester City, Mid-Gloucestershire League, 13 January 1900
Most appearances: 295 - Alex Sykes
Most goals: 73 - Alex Sykes
Record transfer fee paid: £25,000 to Bury for Adrian Randall
Record transfer fee received: £350,000 from Hibernian for Christian Doidge

Record against international opponents

International capped players 
Bold denotes player still actively playing international football

In November 2022, former Forest Green Rovers players, Kieffer Moore and Robert Sánchez were named in the Wales and Spain squads respectively for the 2022 World Cup. They are the first and only former Rovers players to play in a World Cup.

References

External links

Forest Green Rovers at BBC Sport
Forest Green Rovers at GSA

1889 establishments in England
Association football clubs established in 1889
English Football League clubs
Environmental organisations based in England
Football clubs in England
Football clubs in Gloucestershire
 
Gloucestershire County Football League
Gloucestershire Northern Senior League
Hellenic Football League
Nailsworth
National League (English football) clubs
Southern Football League clubs
Stroud and District Football League
Vegan organizations